Freedom Chiya (born 11 July 1979) is a South African male beach volleyball player. He competed for South Africa at the 2012 Summer Olympics with teammate Grant Goldschmidt. He was born in Cape Town, South Africa.

References

1979 births
Living people
Sportspeople from Cape Town
South African beach volleyball players
Men's beach volleyball players
Beach volleyball players at the 2012 Summer Olympics
Olympic beach volleyball players of South Africa
African Games gold medalists for South Africa
African Games medalists in volleyball
Competitors at the 2011 All-Africa Games